Raquel Pa'aluhi Canuto (born October 14, 1990) is an American Brazilian jiu-jitsu grappler and former mixed martial artist.

Canuto was awarded her Black Belt in Brazilian jiu-jitsu by her coach Robert Drysdale. Raquel is the 2014, 2015, 2016, 2017(bb) & 2019(bb) No Gi World Champion and 2016-2018 World Jiu-Jitsu Championship Gi Runner Up.

Personal life
Pa'aluhi is of Hawaiian, Portuguese, Samoan, German, and Irish descent. In 2016 she married Brazilian Jiujitsu Black Belt and World Champion Renato Canuto. Together they run Checkmat Las Vegas.

Mixed martial arts record

|-
|Loss
|align="center" |6–7
|Lisa Verzosa
|Decision (split)
|Invicta FC 42: Cummins vs. Zappitella
|
|align="center" | 3
|align="center" | 5:00
|Kansas City, Kansas, United States
|
|-
|Loss
|align="center" |6–6
|Yana Kunitskaya
|Decision (unanimous)
|Invicta FC 25: Kunitskaya vs. Pa'aluhi
|
|align="center" | 5
|align="center" | 5:00
|Lemoore, California, United States
| For the Invicta FC Bantamweight Championship.
|-
|Win
|align="center" |6–5
|Pannie Kianzad
|Submission (rear-naked choke)
|Invicta FC 21: Anderson vs. Tweet
|
|align="center" | 1
|align="center" | 3:40
|Kansas City, Missouri, United States
|
|-
|Loss
|align="center" |5–5
|Colleen Schneider
|Decision (split)
|Invicta FC 15: Cyborg vs. Ibragimova
|
|align="center" | 3
|align="center" | 5:00
|Costa Mesa, California, United States
|
|-
|Win
|align="center" |5–4
|Ediane Gomes
|Decision (unanimous)
|Invicta FC 12: Kankaanpää vs. Souza
|
|align="center" | 3
|align="center" | 5:00
|Kansas City, Missouri, United States
|
|-
|Win
|align="center" |4–4
|Kaitlin Young
|Decision (unanimous)
|Invicta FC 9: Honchak vs. Hashi
|
|align="center" | 3
|align="center" | 5:00
|Davenport, Iowa, United States
|
|-
|Win
|align="center" |3–4
|Priscilla White
|TKO (punches)
|Destiny MMA Proving Grounds 2
|
|align="center" | 1
|align="center" | 3:03
|Honolulu, Hawaii, United States
|
|-
|Loss
|align="center" |2–4
|Raquel Pennington
|Submission (guillotine choke)
|Destiny MMA Na Koa 1
|
|align="center" | 1
|align="center" | 3:52
|Honolulu, Hawaii, United States
|
|-
|Loss
|align="center" |2–3
|Amanda Nunes
|Technical Submission (rear-naked choke)
|Invicta FC 2: Baszler vs. McMann
|
|align="center" | 1
|align="center" | 2:24
|Kansas City, Kansas, United States
|
|-
|Loss
|align="center" |2–2
|Sara McMann
|Submission (americana)
|ProElite: Arlovski vs. Lopez
|
|align="center" | 3
|align="center" | 2:53
|Honolulu, Hawaii, United States
|
|-
|Win
|align="center" |2–1
|Nikohl Johnson
|TKO (punches)
|X-1 Champions 3
|
|align="center" | 3
|align="center" | 2:06
|Honolulu, Hawaii, United States
|
|-
|Loss
|align="center" |1–1
|Sarah D'Alelio
|Submission (armbar)
|X-1 Heroes
|
|align="center" | 1
|align="center" | 2:13
|Honolulu, Hawaii, United States
|
|-
|Win
|align="center" |1–0
|Jenny Trujillo
|Decision (unanimous)
|X-1 Nations Collide
|
|align="center" | 3
|align="center" | 5:00
|Honolulu, Hawaii, United States
|
|-
|}

References

External links
 
 Raquel Canuto at Invicta FC

1990 births
Living people
American female mixed martial artists
Bantamweight mixed martial artists
Mixed martial artists utilizing Brazilian jiu-jitsu
Mixed martial artists from Hawaii
University of Jamestown alumni
People from Oahu
People from Honolulu County, Hawaii
Native Hawaiian sportspeople
Native Hawaiian people
American people of Portuguese descent
American people of Samoan descent
American people of Irish descent
American people of German descent
American practitioners of Brazilian jiu-jitsu
People awarded a black belt in Brazilian jiu-jitsu
Female Brazilian jiu-jitsu practitioners
World No-Gi Brazilian Jiu-Jitsu Championship medalists
21st-century American women